World Radio is the ninth album by the English singer-songwriter, Leo Sayer, and was released in April 1982. It was (including the greatest hits compilation album, The Very Best of Leo Sayer) his tenth successive Top 50 chart entry in the UK Albums Chart, in a period of a little over eight years.

Track listing

Side one
"Heart (Stop Beating in Time)" (Barry & Robin Gibb) – 4:35
"Paris Dies in the Morning" (Leo Sayer, Andrew McCrorie-Shand) – 3:53
"Have You Ever Been in Love" (Andy Hill, Peter Sinfield, John Danter) – 3:45
"Rumours" (Alan Mark, Ray Smith) – 3:55
"Heroes" (Sayer, David Courtney) – 4:21

Side two
"'Til You Let Your Heart Win" (Allee Willis, Lauren Wood) – 4:41
"End of the Game" (Sayer, Courtney) – 3:28
"Wondering Where the Lions Are" (Bruce Cockburn) – 3:28
"We've Got Ourselves in Love" (Sayer, Courtney) – 3:54
"World Radio" (Sayer, Courtney) – 5:26

Personnel

Musicians
Leo Sayer – guitar, harmonica, vocals
Robin Beck – background vocals
Harry Bluestone – concertmaster
Michael Boddicker – synthesizer
Robbie Buchanan – piano
Bob Christianson – synthesizer
Sammy Figueroa – percussion
Steve George – background vocals
Lani Groves – background vocals
Ralph Hammer – guitar
David Hungate – bass guitar
Steve Khan – guitar
Abraham Laboriel – bass guitar
Will Lee – bass guitar
Marcy Levy – background vocals
Steve Lukather – guitar
Gene Orloff – concertmaster
Richard Page – background vocals
Dean Parks – guitar
Jeff Porcaro – drums
James Stroud – Linn programming, Fairlight, Synclavier, synth programming
David Sanborn - alto saxophone

Production
Record producer: Arif Mardin
Assistant engineers: Terry Christian, Lewis Hahn, Jay Messina, Michael O'Reilly, Gray Russell
Mixing: Jerry Lee Smith
Mastering: George Marino

Charts

References

External links
 
 [ Allmusic.com album credits]

1982 albums
Leo Sayer albums
Albums produced by Arif Mardin
Chrysalis Records albums
Warner Records albums
Albums recorded at Sunset Sound Recorders